Apafram Festival is an annual festival celebrated by the chiefs and people of Akwamu in the Eastern Region of Ghana. It is celebrated in the month of January.

Celebrations 
During the festival, there is a durbar of chiefs. The leaders of the community ride in palanquins. There is also drumming and dancing.

Significance 
The festival is celebrated to forge bondage with the ancestors of the people and ask them for protection.

References 

Festivals in Ghana
Eastern Region (Ghana)